The Chari River, or Shari River, is a  long river, flowing in Central Africa. It is Lake Chad's main source of water.

Geography
The Chari River flows from the Central African Republic through Chad into Lake Chad, following the Cameroon border from N'Djamena, where it is joined by its western and principal tributary, the Logone River.

It provides 90 percent of the water flowing into Lake Chad. The principal tributary is the Logone River, while minor tributaries include the Bahr Salamat, the Bahr Sah), the Bahr Aouk and the Bahr Kéita.

Much of Chad's population, including Sarh and the capital N'Djamena, is concentrated around it.

As of 2016, Chad remains one of four countries where Guinea worm disease remains endemic. The majority of remaining cases are concentrated around the Chari River.

The river supports an important local fishing industry. One of the most highly prized local fish is the Nile perch.

Since the 1960s, there have been proposals to divert water from the Ubangi River to the Chari to revitalize Lake Chad, which would constitute a reversal of the capture of the upper Ubangi from the Chari by the Congo that is believed to have occurred in the early Pleistocene.

History 
The Sao people are said to have lived by this river.

The Chari River basin has been populated by diverse speakers of the Chadic languages, Adamawa languages, Ubangian languages, Bongo-Bagirmi languages.

See also 
 Oubangui-Chari
 Chari–Baguirmi Region
 Moyen-Chari Region
 Chari–Nile languages
 Chari River topics
 Lake Chad topics
 Lake Chad replenishment project
 Waterway

References

 
International rivers of Africa
Rivers of Cameroon
Rivers of the Central African Republic
Rivers of Chad
Lake Chad
Cameroon–Chad border